Monteiro Lobato is a municipality in the state of São Paulo in Brazil. It is part of the Metropolitan Region of Vale do Paraíba e Litoral Norte.

The municipality was named in honor of Brazilian writer José Bento Monteiro Lobato, who was born in the nearby city of Taubaté, and had a farm in the area of the municipality.

The municipality contains part of the  Mananciais do Rio Paraíba do Sul Environmental Protection Area, created in 1982 to protect the sources of the Paraíba do Sul river.

References

External links
  Monteiro Lobato on Explorevale

Municipalities in São Paulo (state)